The Thief of Paris (Le voleur) is a 1967 French crime film directed by Louis Malle and starring Jean-Paul Belmondo as a professional thief (Georges Randal) at the turn of the century in Paris. The film is based on a book of the same title by Georges Darien.

The story centers on his burglaries as well as his ongoing relationship with his cousin Charlotte (Geneviève Bujold). It also features other well-known French actors including Marie Dubois, Charles Denner and Bernadette Lafont. The film had 1,225,555 admissions in France. It was entered into the 5th Moscow International Film Festival.

Plot
In the opening scene, Georges Randal, the thief of the title, breaks into a big house and begins to steal the valuable objects on display. A series of flashbacks (with occasional reversions to the present) then narrates the story of Randal's life. An orphan, he is raised by his uncle along with his cousin Charlotte, who grows into an attractive young woman with whom he falls in love.  When Georges reaches twenty-one and asks for the money his parents left him, he finds that his unscrupulous uncle has stolen it all. He is rejected as a suitor for Charlotte because he is poor. She is then betrothed by her social-climbing father to a dim-witted aristocrat.  Georges steals  the fiance's family jewels and from then on, motivated by a sense of justice and desire for revenge, follows a successful career as a gentleman thief, targeting the haute bourgeoisie. At the end of the film, he has achieved all his aims: he is married to Charlotte, is living in his uncle's house, and has recovered the money his parents left him, as well as having accumulated a fortune through his crimes. Charlotte says to him 'You don't need to steal any more' but he replies 'You don't understand!' It is apparent that he has a compulsion to go on, knowing that he will eventually be caught. The final scene shows him boarding the train back to Paris with the haul from his latest robbery.

Cast
 Jean-Paul Belmondo as Georges Randal
 Geneviève Bujold as Charlotte Randal
 Christian Lude as Urbain Randal, uncle of Georges and father of Charlotte
 Marie Dubois as Geneviève Delpiels
 Julien Guiomar as L'abbé Félix la Margelle
 Paul Le Person as Roger Voisin called Roger-La-Honte
 Marlène Jobert as Broussaille, sister of Roger-La-Honte
 Françoise Fabian as Ida
 Bernadette Lafont as Marguerite 
 Martine Sarcey as Renée Mouratet
 Jacques Debary as Courbassol
 Charles Denner as Cannonier

References

Further reading
 Malle on Malle, edited by Philip French, Faber and Faber, 1993.

External links
 
The Thief of Paris at Le Film Guide
 

1967 films
1960s French-language films
Films directed by Louis Malle
1967 crime films
French crime films
French heist films
French crime comedy films
Films set in the 1900s
Films with screenplays by Jean-Claude Carrière
1960s French films